John Richard Hibbing (born December 31, 1953) is an American political scientist and Foundation Regents University Professor in the Department of Political Science at the University of Nebraska-Lincoln. He is known for his research on the biological and psychological correlates of political ideology. With Kevin B. Smith and John R. Alford, Hibbing is the co-author of Predisposed: Liberals, Conservatives, and the Biology of Political Differences, published by Routledge in 2013.

He is a fellow of the American Association for the Advancement of Science since 2012, and received a Guggenheim Fellowship in 2013.

References

External links
Faculty page

1953 births
Living people
American political scientists
Fellows of the American Association for the Advancement of Science
University of Nebraska–Lincoln faculty
Dana College alumni
University of Iowa alumni
Political psychologists